Dorita Field (1922 – 31 December 2004) was a South African-born town planner and politician in Northern Ireland.

Early life and education 
Born as Dorita Wilson to a Protestant family in Pietermaritzburg, she studied zoology and mathematics at the University of South Africa.

Career 
During World War II, she served in the South African Women's Naval Service on Robben Island. While working in the medical corps, she met a Northern Irishman, Dr. Claude Field. The two married and then moved to Belfast in 1946. Field then studied social work and town planning at Queen's University Belfast, and worked in this field, going on to teach at the Rupert Stanley college of further education. She eventually becoming Director of Community Services at Belfast City Council having previously worked on the redevelopment in the Markets and the Shankill, and conducted a comparative study of the Ballymurphy and New Barnsley estates which drew correlations between rental arrears and unemployment. In this role, she developed leisure centres in Belfast. She served as president of the Royal Town Planning Institute NI from 1979 to 1980.

Political career 
After retiring in 1982, she spent two years in Zimbabwe, chairing a Catholic organisation documenting human rights abuses following the Zimbabwe War of Independence.

On returning to Northern Ireland, she joined the Social Democratic and Labour Party (SDLP), which she claimed was the only party standing in the democratic socialist tradition she shared. Unlike the majority of the party, she claimed not to be an Irish nationalist. She was the party treasurer in the early 1990s, and attempted to ease the party's financial issues. In 1989, she was elected to Belfast City Council, becoming the first member of a nationalist party to represent the Balmoral area. In 1993, her home was firebombed by the Ulster Freedom Fighters, on the same night that Alasdair McDonnell's house was attacked. During this period, she broke with SDLP tradition by attending Remembrance Day commemorations alongside Unionists, for which she wore both a red and a pacifist white poppy.

Field, who had campaigned against apartheid, spent three months on a European Union team monitoring the 1994 South African general election. In 1996, she was elected to the Northern Ireland Forum as one of the SDLP's two "top-up" members.

Later life and legacy 
Dorita Field died on New Year's Eve 2004, aged 82. She was survived by her husband, two children and grandchildren.

References

1922 births
2004 deaths
Members of Belfast City Council
Members of the Northern Ireland Forum
People from Pietermaritzburg
Social Democratic and Labour Party politicians
University of South Africa alumni
20th-century British women politicians
Alumni of Queen's University Belfast
20th-century politicians from Northern Ireland
Women councillors in Northern Ireland